Adolf Gerhard Brune (1870–1935) was an American composer, born in Germany; he came to the United States in 1870.  His output was mainly orchestral, and included three symphonies, two piano concertos, and four overtures.  He also wrote five string quartets and two string quintets, among other chamber works.

References

External links
 

1870 births
1935 deaths
American male composers
American composers
German emigrants to the United States